Sheikh Hasina Wazed (née Sheikh Hasina ;  ; , , born 28 September 1947) is a Bangladeshi politician who has served as the prime minister of Bangladesh since January 2009. Hasina is the daughter of the founding father and first president of Bangladesh, Bangabandhu Sheikh Mujibur Rahman. She previously served as the prime minister from June 1996 to July 2001. She is the longest serving prime minister in the history of Bangladesh, having served for a combined total of over 19 years.

Hasina's term as the Prime Minister witnessed worsening security situation that includes the Bangladesh Rifles revolt in 2009 which killed 56 officers of Bangladesh Army for which she was blamed by the army officers due to her refusal to intervene against the revolt. The period also saw increasing attacks by Islamic extremists in the country, including the July 2016 Dhaka attack which has been described as "deadliest Islamist attack in Bangladeshi history" by BBC. On the economic front, Bangladesh's external debt has more than tripled under Hasina's term, reaching $95.86 billion by the end of fiscal year 2021–22, leading the government to seek IMF loan twice in this period, first in 2012 and again in 2022.

Under her tenure as Prime Minister, Bangladesh has experienced democratic backsliding. Human Rights Watch documented widespread enforced disappearances and extrajudicial killings under her government. Many politicians and journalists have been systematically and judicially punished for challenging her views. Reporters Without Borders in 2021 characterized Sheikh Hasina as a predator for curbing press freedom in Bangladesh since 2014. According to experts, the Hasina-led government's repression of political opposition as well as shrinking democratic and civic
space has created "the space for extremist groups to flourish" and "has generated a violent backlash from Islamist groups." 

In 2014, she was re-elected for a third term in an election that was boycotted by the BNP and criticised by international observers. She won her fourth term in 2018, following an election marred with violence and criticised by the opposition as being rigged.

Sheikh Hasina has been ranked as the 42nd most powerful women in the world by Forbes Magazine.

Early life

Hasina was born on 28 September 1947 to the Bengali Muslim Sheikh family of Tungipara in East Bengal. Her father was Sheikh Mujibur Rahman, the founding father and the first President of Bangladesh. She has Iraqi Arab ancestry through her paternal grandfather Sheikh Lutfar Rahman, who was a direct descendant of 15th-century Muslim preacher Sheikh Awwal of Baghdad. Her mother was Sheikh Fazilatunnesa Mujib. She has said in many interviews that she had grown up in fear due to threats to her politically prominent father, who was assassinated in 1975. She married physicist M. A. Wazed Miah, who was chosen for her by her father, in 1968.

During the peak of violence during the 1970 Pakistani general election, as well as her father's arrest, she had lived in refuge with her grandmother. She was active in the student politics of the University of Dhaka.

Hasina was not in Bangladesh when her father, and most of her family, were assassinated on 15 August 1975 during a military coup d'état by renegade officers of the Bangladesh Army.

She was in West Germany with her husband, M. A. Wazed Miah, who was working as a nuclear physicist. She moved to New Delhi in late 1975, having been granted asylum by India. Her son, Sajeeb Wazed Joy, studied at Indian boarding schools. During her time in India, Hasina was not involved in politics, but became close friends with Suvra Mukherjee, wife of the future Indian President Pranab Mukherjee.

Hasina was barred from returning to Bangladesh until after she was elected to lead the Awami League on 16 February 1981, and arrived home on 17 May 1981.

Early political career

Movement against military rule (1981–1991)
While living in exile in India, Hasina was elected President of the Awami League (AL) in 1981. The AL has been described as a "left-of-center" party.

Under martial law, Hasina was in and out of detention throughout the 1980s. In 1984, she was put under house arrest in February and again in November. In March 1985, she was put under house arrest for another three months.

Hasina and the AL participated in the 1986 Bangladeshi general election held under President Hussain Muhammad Ershad. She served as the leader of the parliamentary opposition in 1986–1987. She led an eight-party alliance as opposition against Ershad. Hasina's decision to take part in the election had been criticised by her opponents, since the election was held under martial law, and the other main opposition group boycotted the poll. However, her supporters maintained that she used the platform effectively to challenge Ershad's rule. Ershad dissolved the parliament in December 1987 when Hasina and her Awami League resigned in an attempt to call for a fresh general election to be held under a neutral government. During November and December in 1987, a mass uprising happened in Dhaka and several people were killed, including Noor Hossain, an Awami League activist and support of Hasina.

Her party, along with the Bangladesh Nationalist Party (BNP) under Khaleda Zia, continued to work to restore democratically elected government, which they achieved after a constitutional referendum returning the country to a parliamentary form of government. The subsequent parliamentary general election in 1991 was won by the BNP.

Leader of the Opposition (1991–1996)
After several years of autocratic rule, widespread protests and strikes had paralysed the economy. Government officers refused to follow orders and resigned. Members of the Bangladesh Rifles laid down their weapons instead of firing on protestors and curfew was openly violated. Hasina worked with Khaleda Zia in organising opposition to Ershad. A huge mass protest in December 1990 ousted Ershad from power when he resigned in favour of his vice president, Justice Shahabuddin Ahmed, the Chief Justice of the Bangladesh Supreme Court. The caretaker government, headed by Ahmed, administered a general election for the parliament. The Bangladesh Nationalist Party led by Khaleda Zia won a general majority, and Hasina's Awami League emerged as the largest opposition party. Of the three constituencies Hasina contested, she lost in two and won in one. Accepting defeat, she offered her resignation as the party president but stayed on at the request of party leaders.

Politics in Bangladesh took a decisive turn in 1994, after a by-election in Magura-2, held after the death of the member of parliament for that constituency, a member of Hasina's party. The Awami League had expected to win back the seat, but the BNP candidate won through rigging and manipulation, according to the neutral observer who came to witness the election. Hasina led the Bangladesh Awami League in boycotting the parliament from 1994. Relations between Hasina and Zia nosedived after this.

First premiership (1996–2001)

The Awami League (AL), with other opposition parties, demanded that the next general elections be held under a neutral caretaker government, and that provision for caretaker governments to manage elections be incorporated in the constitution. The ruling Bangladesh Nationalist Party (BNP) refused to act on these demands.

Opposition parties launched an unprecedented campaign, calling strikes for weeks on end. The Government accused them of destroying the economy while the opposition countered that the BNP could resolve the issue by acceding to their demands. In late 1995, the members of parliament of the AL and other parties resigned en masse. Parliament completed its five-year term and the February 1996 general election was held. The election was boycotted by all major parties except the ruling BNP, who won all the seats in the parliament as a result. Hasina described the election as a farce.

The new parliament, composed almost entirely of BNP members, amended the constitution to create provisions for a caretaker government (CTG). The June 1996 general election was held under a neutral caretaker government headed by retired Chief Justice Muhammad Habibur Rahman. The AL won 146 seats, a plurality, but fell short of a simple majority. Khaleda Zia, leader of the BNP who won 104 seats, denounced the results and alleged vote rigging. This was in contrast with the neutral observers who said that the election was free and fair.

Hasina served her first term as Prime Minister of Bangladesh from June 1996 to July 2001. She signed the 30-year water-sharing treaty with India governing the Ganges. Her administration repealed the Indemnity Act, which granted immunity from prosecution to the killers of Sheikh Mujib. Her government opened-up the telecommunications industry to the private sector, which until then was limited to government-owned companies. In December 1997, Hasina's administration signed the Chittagong Hill Tracts Peace Accord, ending the insurgency in the Chittagong Division for which Hasina won the UNESCO Peace Prize. Her government established the Ashrayan-1 Project while bilateral relations with neighbouring states improved. Hasina's government completed the Bangabandhu Bridge mega project in 1998. In 1999, the government started the New Industrial Policy (NIP) which aimed to strengthen the private sector and encourage growth.

The nation's economy remained resilient and experienced robust growth during Hasina's first tenure. The Hasina government implemented key reforms to different sectors of the economy, which resulted in the country attaining an average of 5.5% GDP growth. The consumer price index remained at 5%, lower than other developing states who experienced 10% inflation. The economic growth was considered to be an impressive achievement in light of the major floods Bangladesh faced in 1998. The Fifth Five-Year Plan (1997-2002) of the government placed an emphasis on poverty alleviation programmes which provided credit and training to unemployed youths and women. Food-grain production increased from 19 million tons to 26.5 million tons while the poverty rate reduced. A Housing Fund was established to provide fiscal assistance to those homeless as a result of river erosion. The government launched the Ekti Bari Ekti Khamar scheme which accentuated the incomes of the poorer segments of society through household farming.

The Hasina government adopted the New Industrial Policy in 1999 which aimed to bolster the private sector and attract foreign direct investment, thus expediating the globalisation process. The NIP aimed for 25% of the economy to be industry based with 20% of the country's workforce employed in industry. It encouraged the institution of small, cottage and labour intensive industries with an onus on skill development for women for employment, development of indigenous technology and industries based on local raw materials. The NIP allowed for foreign investors to own 100% equity in Bangladeshi enterprises without prior approval from the government and all but four sectors of the economy were opened up to the private sector.

Attempts were made to create a social security system to protect the most vulnerable in society. The Hasina administration introduced an allowance scheme which resulted in 400,000 elderly people receiving monthly allowances. This scheme was later extended to widows, distressed and deserted women. A national foundation devoted to rehabilitation and training of people, with disabilities was founded with an initial grant of ৳100 million funded by the government. The Ashrayan-1 Project provided shelter and employment to the homeless.

Hasina was the first prime minister to engage in a "Prime Minister's Question-Answer Time" in the Jatiya Sangsad. The Jatiya Sangsad repealed the Indemnity Act, allowing for the killers of Bangabandhu Sheikh Mujibur Rahman to be prosecuted. The government introduced a four-tier system of local government including the Gram Parishad, Zila Parishad and Upazila Parishad by passing legisation.

The Hasina government liberalised the telecommunications industry, initially granting four licenses to private companies to provide cellular mobile telephone services. This resulted in the previous state monopoly being disbanded meaning prices began to reduce and access became more widespread. The government established the Bangladesh Telecommunication Regulatory Commission to regulate the newly liberalised telecommunications industry. 

The government established the National Policy for Women's Advancement which sought to ensure equality between men and women. The policy aimed to guarantee security and employment, create an educated and skilled workforce, eliminate discrimination and repression against women, establish human rights and end poverty and ensure participation in socio-economic development. The government introduced three reserved seats for women in all Union Parishad election in December 1997. Hasina's cabinet approved the National Plan of Action for Children in 1999 to ensure rights and improved upbringing. 

Hasina attended the World Micro Credit summit in Washington DC; the World Food Summit in Rome; the Inter-Parliamentary Union Conference in India; the OIC summit in Pakistan; the 9th SAARC summit in the Maldives; the first D-8 summit in Turkey; the 5th World Conference for the Aged in Germany; the Commonwealth summit in the UK and the OIC summit in Iran. Hasina also visited the United States, Saudi Arabia, Japan, the Philippines and Indonesia. 

Bangladesh joined two multilateral bodies, the Bay of Bengal Initiative for Multi-Sectoral Technical and Economic Cooperation (BIMSTEC) and D-8 Organization for Economic Cooperation (D-8). She became the first Bangladeshi prime minister since independence to complete an entire five-year term. 

In the 2001 general election, despite winning 40% of the popular vote (slightly less than BNP's 41%), the AL won just 62 seats in parliament as a result of the first-past-the-post electoral system, while the 'Four Party Alliance' led by BNP won 234 seats, giving them a two-thirds majority in parliament. Hasina herself ran in three constituencies, and was defeated in a constituency in Rangpur, which included her husband's home town, but won in two other seats. Hasina and the AL rejected the results, claiming that the election was rigged with the assistance of the president and the caretaker government. The international community was largely satisfied with the elections, and the 'Four Party Alliance' went on to form a government.

Leader of the Opposition (2001–2008)
The Awami League MPs were irregular in attending parliament during the following period. In late 2003, the Awami League started its first major anti-government movement, culminating in the declaration by party general secretary Abdul Jolil that the government would fall before 30 April 2004. This failed to happen and was seen as a blow to the party and Hasina, who had implicitly supported Jolil.

Assassination attempt (2004)

During her second term as leader of the opposition, political unrest and violence increased. MP Ahsanullah Master died after he was shot in May 2004. This was followed by a grenade attack on 21 August on an Awami League gathering in Dhaka, resulting in the death of 24 party supporters, including Ivy Rahman, party women's secretary. In October 2018, a special court gave verdicts in two cases filed over the incident; the court ruled that it was a well-orchestrated plan, executed through abuse of state power, and all the accused, including BNP Senior vice-chairman Tarique Rahman (in absentia) and former top intelligence officials, were found guilty. The court prescribed various punishments. SAMS Kibria, Hasina's close advisor and former finance minister was assassinated that year (2004) in a grenade attack in Sylhet.

In June 2005, A. B. M. Mohiuddin Chowdhury, the incumbent AL Mayor, won an important election in Chittagong, the second-largest city in Bangladesh. This election was seen as a showdown between the opposition and the ruling party.

Detention during military intervention (2006–2008)
The months preceding the planned 22 January 2007 elections were filled with political unrest and controversy. Following the end of Khaleda Zia's government in October 2006, there were protests and strikes, during which 40 people were killed in the following month, over uncertainty about who would head the Caretaker Government. The caretaker government had difficulty bringing all parties to the table. The AL and its allies protested and alleged that the caretaker government favoured the BNP.

The interim period was marred with violence and strikes. Presidential Advisor Mukhlesur Rahman Chowdhury negotiated with Hasina and Khaleda Zia and brought all the parties to the planned 22 January 2007 parliamentary elections. Later the nomination of Ershad was cancelled by the returning officer of the Election Commission as Ershad had been convicted on a corruption case. As a result, the Grand Alliance withdrew its candidates en masse on the last day possible. They demanded that a voters' roll be published.

Later in the month, President Iajuddin Ahmed was compelled to declare a state of emergency. Consequently, Lt General Moeen Uddin Ahmed took control of the government. Political activity was prohibited. Fakhruddin Ahmed became the chief advisor with the support of the Bangladesh Army.

Hasina went to the United States embassy on 14 March 2007 along with Kazi Zafarullah and Tareq Ahmed Siddique. She would fly the next day to the United States accompanied by Tareq Ahmed Siddique and Abdus Sobhan Golap. She visited her son and daughter who live in the United States. She then moved to the United Kingdom.

In April 2007, Hasina was charged with graft and extortion by the military-backed caretaker government during the 2006–2008 political crisis. She was accused of having forced businessman Tajul Islam Farooq to pay bribes in 1998 before his company could build a power plant. Farooq said that he paid Hasina for approving his project.

On 18 April 2007, the Government barred Hasina from returning, stating that she had made provocative statements and that her return could cause disorder. This was described as a temporary measure. The Caretaker Government had also been trying to get Khaleda Zia to leave the country. Hasina vowed to return home, and on 22 April 2007, a warrant was issued for her arrest for murder. Describing the case against her as "totally false and fake", Hasina said that she wanted to defend herself against the charges in court. On 23 April 2007, the arrest warrant was suspended, and on 25 April 2007, the ban on Hasina's entry was dropped. After spending 51 days in the United States and the United Kingdom, on 7 May 2007 Hasina returned to Dhaka, where she was greeted by a crowd of several thousand. She told reporters that the government should not have delayed her return.

On 16 July 2007, Hasina was arrested by police at her home and taken before a local court in Dhaka. She was accused of extortion and denied bail, and was held in a building converted into jail on the premises of the National Parliament. The AL said the arrest was politically motivated. On 17 July 2007, the Anti-Corruption Commission sent notices to both Hasina and Khaleda Zia, instructing them to provide details of their assets within one week. Hasina's son Sajeeb Wazed was out of the country and said he would try to organise a worldwide protest. These arrests of the political leaders were widely seen as a move by the military-backed interim government to force Hasina and Zia out of the country and into political exile. United Kingdom MPs condemned the arrest.

On 11 April 2007, the police filed murder charges against Hasina, alleging that she masterminded the killing in October 2006 of four supporters of a rival political party. The four alleged victims were beaten to death during clashes between the AL and rival party activists. Hasina was visiting the United States at the time.

On 30 July 2007, the High Court suspended Hasina's extortion trial and ordered her release on bail. On 2 September 2007, an additional case was filed against Hasina by the Anti-Corruption Commission regarding the awarding of a contract for the construction of a power plant in 1997, for which she allegedly took a bribe of 30 million takas and kept the contract from going to the lowest bidder. Six others were also accused of involvement. A graft case was filed against Zia on the same day.

On 13 January 2008, Hasina was indicted on extortion charges by a special court along with two of her relatives, her sister Sheikh Rehana and her cousin Sheikh Selim. On 6 February, the High Court stopped the trial, ruling that she could not be prosecuted under emergency laws for crimes alleged to have been committed prior to the imposition of the state of emergency.

On 11 June 2008, Hasina was released on parole for medical reasons. The next day she flew to the United States to be treated for hearing impairment, eye problems and high blood pressure. Syed Modasser Ali, her personal physician, threatened to sue the caretaker government over negligence regarding Hasina's treatment during her detention.

The caretaker government held mayoral elections in which AL won 12 out of 13 elections. The government extended her two-month medical parole by one more month.

Second premiership (2009–present)

Second term (2009–2014) 

On 6 November 2008, Hasina returned to Bangladesh to contest the 2008 general election scheduled for 29 December. She decided to participate in the parliamentary election under the banner of the "Grand Alliance" with the Jatiya Party, led by Hussain Muhammad Ershad, as its main partner. On 11 December 2008, Hasina formally announced her party's election manifesto during a news conference, and vowed to build a "Digital Bangladesh" by 2021. 

The AL manifesto was entitled A Charter for Change and included the party's commitment to Vision 2021. The manifesto included pledges too implement measures to reduce price hikes; combat corruption by strengthening the independent ACC and submission of annual wealth statements by influential people; introduction of a long-term policy towards power and energy increasing power generation to 7,000 megawatts by 2013; bringing vibrancy to the agriculture sector and extending the safety net to the poor; creating good governance and curtailing terrorism and religious extremism; prosecution of 1971 war criminals; ensuring an independent and impartial judiciary; reforming the electoral system; strengthening the Human Rights Commission and de-politicising the administration.

Her Awami League and the Grand Alliance (a total of 14 parties) won the 2008 general election with a two-thirds majority, having won 230 out of 299 seats. Khaleda Zia, leader of the BNP-led coalition (4-Party Alliance), rejected the results of the election by accusing the Chief Election Commissioner of "stage-managing the parliamentary election". Hasina was sworn into office as prime minister for a second term on 6 January 2009. Independent observers declared that the elections were held in a festive and peaceful atmosphere.

After being elected prime minister, Hasina reneged on her agreement with the Jatiya Party to make Ershad, its leader, the president.

Hasina removed Awami League central committee members who supported reforms forced by the previous caretaker government. She had to confront a major national crisis in the form of the 2009 Bangladesh Rifles revolt over a pay dispute, which resulted in 56 deaths, including Bangladesh Army officers. Hasina was widely praised domestically and internationally for her handling of the mutiny, however some criticised her for not ordering an armed raid of the BDR Rifles compound. The Daily Star commended "her sagacious handling of the situation which resulted in the prevention of a further bloodbath".In 2011, the parliament removed the law that required non-party caretaker government hold elections. In 2012, she maintained a hard-line stance and refused to allow entry to Rohingya refugees fleeing Myanmar during the 2012 Rakhine State riots.

On 27 June 2013, a case against Hasina and 24 other Bangladeshi Ministers and security personnel was lodged at the International Criminal Court (ICC) for the alleged violation of human rights. She has been "credited internationally" for the achievement of some of the United Nations Millennium Development Goals. In 2012 a coup attempt against her by mid-ranking army officers was stopped, with the Bangladesh Army being tipped off by an Indian intelligence agency. The Bangladesh Army described the army officers involved as being Islamist extremists.

In 2012, she had a falling out with Muhammad Yunus, Nobel laureate and founder of Grameen Bank, following a Norwegian documentary that was critical of Yunus's transferring of money from Grameen Bank to an affiliate organisation. Yunus transferred the money back after the documentary aired but it increased scrutiny of the bank by the government and media in Bangladesh. Yunus lost control of his bank following a court verdict. He criticised Hasina and other Bangladeshi politicians. She responded by saying she did not understand why Yunus blamed her when it was a court verdict that removed him from Grameen Bank.

During this term, her government led and succeeded in forming the International Crimes Tribunal, to investigate and prosecute suspects involved in the Bangladesh Genocide, committed by the Pakistan Army and their local collaborators, Razakars, Al-Badr, and Al-Shams during the Bangladesh Liberation War in 1971.

Third term (2014–2019) 

Hasina secured a second-consecutive term in office with her ruling Awami League and its Grand Alliance allies, winning the 2014 general election by a landslide. The AL-led Grand Alliance won 267 seats, surpassing its 2008 poll success – when it secured 263 parliamentary seats.  Sheikh Hasina's Awami League has run Bangladesh since 2009 and won 288 seats in this election. One of the leading opposition parties accused it of using stuffed ballot boxes. The election was boycotted by major opposition parties including the BNP.

The election was controversial, with reports of violence and an alleged crackdown on the opposition in the run-up to the election. In the election 153 seats (of 300) went uncontested, of which the Awami League won 127 by default. Hasina's Awami League won a safe parliamentary majority with a total of 234 seats. As a result of the boycott and violence, voter turnout was lower than the previous few elections at only 51%. The day after the result, Hasina said that the boycott should "not mean there will be a question of legitimacy. People participated in the poll and other parties participated." Despite the controversy Hasina went on to form a government with Ershad's Jatiya Party (who won 34 seats) as the official opposition.

The election has been called "an electoral farce". The BNP wanted the elections to be held under a neutral caretaker government and had hoped to use protests to force the government to do so.

In March 2017, Bangladesh's first two submarines were commissioned. In September 2017, Hasina's government granted refuge and aid to around a million Rohingya refugees and urged Myanmar to end violence against the Rohingya community. The majority of the Bangladeshi people supported the government's decision to provide refugee status to the Rohingya. Hasina received credit and praise for her actions.

Hasina supported calls to remove the Statue of Justice in front of the Supreme Court. This was seen as the government bowing down to the pressure of those who use religion for political ends.

Hasina is a patron of the Asian University for Women, led by Chancellor Cherie Blair, and including the First Lady of Japan, Akie Abe, as well as Irina Bokova, the Director-General of UNESCO.

Fourth term (2019–present)

Hasina won her third consecutive term, her fourth overall, when her Awami League won 288 of the 300 parliamentary seats. The leader of the main opposition alliance, Kamal Hossain, declared the vote "farcical" and rejected the results. Before the election, Human Rights Watch and other rights organisations had accused the government of creating an intimidating environment for the Opposition. The New York Times editorial board described the election as farcical, the editorial stated that it was likely Hasina would have won without vote-rigging and questioned why she did so.

The BNP, the main opposition party that has been out of power for 12 years and boycotted the 2014 general election, fared extremely poorly. Winning only eight seats, the party and its Jatiya Oikya Front alliance have been marginalised to the weakest opposition ever since Bangladesh's post-Ershad democratic restoration in 1991.

In May 2021, Hasina provided the inaugural address for the opening of a new headquarters for the Bangladesh Post Office, named the Dak Bhaban. In her address, Hasina urged for further development of the postal service in response to the COVID-19 pandemic in Bangladesh. Developmental measures outlined in the address include continuing the service's digital transformation, and the construction of cooling units in postal warehouses to pave the way for the sending of perishable food by mail.

In June 2022, Hasina inaugurated the Padma Bridge mega project, the country's longest bridge. The bridge connects the less-developed south west of the country to Dhaka. The bridge was self-financed by Bangladesh at a cost of ৳30,193.39 crore (US$3.6 billion) after the World Bank withdrew funding and is projected to increase the nation's GDP by 1.23%. While inaugurating the bridge, Hasina stated "Today, I am happy, proud and overwhelmed along with millions of people in the country. This bridge belongs to the people of Bangladesh and it involves all our passion, creativity, courage, endurance and perseverance."

In December 2022, anti-government protests occurred, linked to the rising cost of living as a result of the Russia-Ukraine conflict. On 28 December, Hasina opened the first phase of Dhaka Metro Rail, the country's first mass-rapid transit system from Uttara to Agargaon.

In July 2022, the Finance Ministry requested fiscal assistance from the International Monetary Fund. The government cited depleting foreign-exchange reserves as a result of the sanctions in response to the Russia-Ukraine conflict. A staff level agreement was reached in November 2022 and in January 2023, the IMF agreed to supply a support programme totalling US$4.7 billion, consisting of US$3.3 billion under the Extended Credit Facility and US$1.4 billion under the new Resilience and Sustainability Facility. The IMF stated support package "will help preserve macroeconomic stability, protect the vulnerable and foster inclusive and green growth."

In January 2022, the government passed a law in the Jatiya Sangsad establishing the Universal Pension Scheme. All Bangladeshi citizens, including expatriates, between 18 and 60 years old are eligible to receive a monthly stipend under the scheme.

Controversies 
The Padma Bridge graft scandal was a political incident in Bangladesh that involved the ruling Awami League government that allegedly sought, in exchange for the awarding of the construction contract, a large amount of money from the Canadian construction company SNC-Lavalin. The allegations were subsequently found to be false and without merit, and a Canadian court subsequently dismissed the case.

As a result of the allegations, The World Bank pulled out of a project to provide funding for the Padma Bridge, citing corruption concerns, cancelling  of credit for the 6 km-long (four miles) road-rail bridge over the Padma River. One of the individuals implicated was Minister of Communications Syed Abul Hossain who subsequently resigned and was later acquitted of any wrongdoing. On 11 July 2012, BNP General-Secretary Mirza Fakhrul Islam Alamgir said the Awami League government should make public a letter sent by the World Bank, wherein the Bank brought graft charges against Hasina and three other figures. On 17 January 2016, Hasina stated that a managing director of a bank in the United States provoked the World Bank to cancel the loan.

On 24 January 2017, in a speech in parliament, Prime Minister Hasina blamed Muhammad Yunus for the World Bank's pulling out of the project. According to her, Yunus lobbied with the former United States Secretary of State Hillary Clinton to persuade the World Bank to terminate the loan. On 10 February 2017, a justice of the Superior Court of Ontario dismissed the bribery-conspiracy case for lack of any evidence.

In 2018, Hasina's government passed the controversial Digital Security Act, 2018, under which any criticism deemed inappropriate by the government over the internet or any other media could be punished by prison terms of various degrees. This was heavily criticised both domestically and internationally for suppressing people's freedom of speech, as well as undermining press freedom in Bangladesh.

In December 2022, the Hasina government ordered the closure of 191 websites accused of publishing “anti-state news” citing intelligence reports. Dhaka district authorities ordered the closure of Dainik Dinkal, which is owned by Tarique Rahman of the Bangladesh Nationalist Party (BNP). Dainik Dinkel appealed the order to the Bangladesh Press Council who dismissed their appeal in February 2022, resulting in its closure. The move has been criticised by government opponents who claim the move is an attempt to stifle opposition to the government. The government claimed Dainik Dinkal violated articles 10, 11, 16, 21(1)(kha) of the Printing Presses and Publications (Declaration and Registration) Act, 1973 as it had irregular publication and its publisher was a convicted felon.

Personal life
In 1968, Hasina married M. A. Wazed Miah (1942–2009), a Bangladeshi physicist, writer, and chairman of the Bangladesh Atomic Energy Commission. She has a son, Sajeeb Wazed, and a daughter, Saima Wazed. Saima's father-in-law is a former minister of Expatriates' Welfare and Overseas Employment and LGRD, Khandaker Mosharraf Hossain. Hasina's only living sibling, Sheikh Rehana, served as the adviser of Tungipara upazila unit Awami League in Gopalganj in 2017. Hasina's niece (and Sheikh Rehana's daughter) is Tulip Siddiq, the UK politician serving as Member of Parliament for the Hampstead and Kilburn constituency.

Throughout her political career, Sheikh Hasina has survived a total of 19 assassination attempts on her life. Hasina suffers from a hearing impairment as a result of injuries sustained during the 2004 grenade attack.

Bibliography 
 সাদা কালো (Black and White)
 Democracy in Distress Demeaned Humanity
 শেখ রাসেল (Sheikh Rasel)
 আমরা জনগণের কথা বলতে এসেছি (We Came Here To Speak For The People)
 আন্তর্জাতিক সম্পর্ক উন্নয়নে শেখ হাসিনা (Sheikh Hasina On Developing International relations)
 Living in Tears
 রচনাসমগ্র ১
 রচনাসমগ্র ২
 সামরিকতন্ত্র বনাম গণতন্ত্র (Militarism versus Democracy)
 Development For the Masses
 Democracy Poverty Elimination and Peace
 বিপন্ন গণতন্ত্র লাঞ্চিত মানবতা (Endangered Democracy, Oppressed Humanity)
 জনগণ এবং গণতন্ত্র (People and democracy)
 সহেনা মানবতার অবমাননা (Can't Tolerate the Insults of Humanity)
 ওরা টোকাই কেন (Why they are dumpster diving)
 বাংলাদেশে স্বৈরতন্ত্রের জন্ম (The Birth of Autocracy in Bangladesh)
 বাংলাদেশ জাতীয় সংসদে বঙ্গবন্ধু শেখ মুজিবুর রহমান (Sheikh Mujib in Bangadesh Parliament)
 শেখ মুজিব আমার পিতা (Sheikh Mujib: My father)
 সবুজ মাঠ পেরিয়ে (Beyond the green field)
 দারিদ্র দূরীকরণে কিছু চিন্তাভাবনা (Few Thoughts on Eradicating Poverty)
 বিশ্ব প্রামান্য ঐতিহ্যে বঙ্গবন্ধুর ভাষণ
 নির্বাচিত ১০০ ভাষণ (Selected 100 speeches)
 নির্বাচিত প্রবন্ধ (Selected Essay)
 The Quest For Vision 2021 – 1st part
 The Quest For Vision 2021 – 2nd part
 Muktidata Sheikh Mujib (Preface)

Honours
 Mother of humanity by Channel 4
 Planet 50–50 champion by UN-Women.
 Agent of Change Award by Global Partnership Forum.
 One of the Time 100 in 2018, where she was praised for accepting Rohingya refugees but criticised for "stumbling badly on human rights" and exhibiting a "tendency toward authoritarianism" by presiding over a government that uses extrajudicial killings and enforced disappearances to quash criticism and suppress political dissent.
 59th place on Forbes list of 100 most powerful women in the world.
 Degree of Doctor of Law by the Boston University on 6 February 1997.
 Honorary Doctor of Law by the Waseda University of Japan on 4 July 1997.
 Honorary Doctorate of Philosophy in Liberal Arts by the University of Abertay Dundee on 25 October 1997.
 The Félix Houphouët-Boigny Peace Prize by the UNESCO for 1998.
 Mother Teresa Award by the All India Peace Council in 1998.
 M.K. Gandhi Award for 1998 by the Mahatma M K Gandhi Foundation of Oslo, Norway.
 Awarded Medal of Distinction in 1996–97 and 1998–99 and Head of State Medal in 1996–97 by the Lions Clubs International.
 Honorary Degree of 'Desikottama' (Doctor of Literature, honoris causa) by the Visva-Bharati University of West Bengal, India on 28 January 1999.
 The Ceres Medal by the Food and Agriculture Organization for 1999.
 Doctor of Law (honoris causa), by the Australian National University on 20 October 1999.
 Honorary Doctor of Law by the University of Dhaka on 18 December 1999.
 Honorary Doctor of Humane Letters by University of Bridgeport on 5 September 2000.
 The Pearl S. Buck Award by the Randolph College on 9 April 2000.
 Named Paul Harris Fellow by the Rotary Foundation.
 Indira Gandhi Prize for 2009.
 Doctor of Literature (honoris causa) by the Tripura University in January 2012.
 UNESCO Peace Tree award for her commitment to women's empowerment and girl's education in 2014.
 UN environment prize for leadership on climate change.
 Doctor of the University (Honorary) by the Sher-e-Bangla Agricultural University on 16 November 2015.
 Doctor of Letters (Honorary) by the Kazi Nazrul University, West Bengal, India on 26 May 2018.
Recipient of the Lifetime Achievement Award (Champions of the Earth) in 2015.

In popular culture
 In 2018 Hasina appears in the title role in a docudrama Hasina: A Daughter's Tale, directed by Rezaur Rahman Khan Piplu.
 On 1 February 2021, Hasina was referred in Al Jazeera's 64-minute documentary All the Prime Minister's Men.

References

Further reading

External links
 
 
 

|-

|-

|-

|-

|-

|-

|-

|-

|-

1947 births
Living people
People from Gopalganj District, Bangladesh
 
10th Jatiya Sangsad members
11th Jatiya Sangsad members
20th-century Bangladeshi people
20th-century Bangladeshi women politicians
20th-century Bengalis
20th-century Muslims
21st-century Bangladeshi politicians
21st-century Bangladeshi women politicians
21st-century Bengalis
21st-century Muslims
5th Jatiya Sangsad members
7th Jatiya Sangsad members
8th Jatiya Sangsad members
9th Jatiya Sangsad members
Awami League politicians
Bangladeshi people of Arab descent
Bangladeshi Sunni Muslims
Daughters of national leaders
Eden Mohila College alumni
Female defence ministers
Female interior ministers
Heads of government who were later imprisoned
Honorary Fellows of Bangla Academy
Leaders of the Opposition (Bangladesh)
Presidents of the Awami League
Prime Ministers of Bangladesh
Sheikh Mujibur Rahman family
Women members of the Jatiya Sangsad
Women opposition leaders
Women prime ministers
University of Dhaka alumni